Neil Anthony Morrissey (born 4 July 1962) is an English actor. He is known for his role as Tony in Men Behaving Badly. Other notable acting roles include Deputy Head Eddie Lawson in the BBC One school-based drama series Waterloo Road, Nigel Morton in Line of Duty, and Rocky in Boon. Morrissey also provides the voice of many cartoon characters, including Robert McGraw (Bob the Builder), Roley, Lofty, Mr. Angelo Sabatini, Mr. Fothergill, Farmer Pickles and Scrufty in the original UK version of Bob the Builder.

Early life
Morrissey was born on 4 July 1962 in Stafford, Staffordshire, the third of four sons of Irish parents who were both psychiatric nurses. He and his youngest brother Stephen spent much of their childhood in separate foster homes, Morrissey spending most of his time at Penkhull Children's Home, under the care of Margaret Cartlidge.

He attended Thistley Hough High School in Penkhull, where he discovered a love for acting through the encouragement of teacher Sheila Steele. He studied for his A-levels at the City of Stoke-on-Trent Sixth Form College. It was there that he realised that his time in care would end at the end of his first year, aged 17, with the bleak prospect of a move to a working boys hostel that could end his academic and dramatic career. A solution was found through the family of his friend, Mark Langston, who fostered Neil until the summer of his 18th birthday.
 
Morrissey had developed his skills and reputation as an actor through his teenage years at Stoke Schools Theatre, Stoke Repertory Theatre and Stoke Original Theatre, performing at the Edinburgh Fringe Festival in 1979. His application to the Guildhall School of Music and Drama resulted in an unconditional offer, which paved the way for the next steps in his theatrical growth. Arriving with no educational grant and no living funds, he was helped by the school to obtain an educational grant, and he 'sofa-surfed' for his first year with friends. During this time he and a fellow student started a street theatre act, which gained them an agent, and hence the required 40 hours of bookings to gain an Equity card.

Career

Acting
Offered the leading role as Robin Hood in The Theatre Chipping Norton's 1982 pantomime, Morrissey agreed to leave the Guildhall School in the first term of his third year. He quickly paid off his student debts by landing parts in film and theatre productions. In 1984, Morrissey played Able Seaman Matthew Quintal in The Bounty alongside Mel Gibson, Anthony Hopkins and Laurence Olivier. In the same year, he also appeared in episode 5 (of series 5) of the police drama Juliet Bravo, shown on BBC1, and had an uncredited role in the nuclear war film Threads.

Morrissey shot to fame in 1987 as dim biker Rocky in the ITV drama series Boon. In 1990, he played the lead role of Noddy in the British spoof horror film I Bought a Vampire Motorcycle, which involved many of the actors from Boon.

His role as Tony in Men Behaving Badly was created to replace the character of Dermot after Harry Enfield's departure from the series. The series became one of the most popular UK sitcoms of the 1990s and turned Morrissey into a national star and a target for the tabloid newspapers. His ongoing romance storyline with co-star Leslie Ash led to the pair appearing in several advertisements for Homebase. In 1997, he starred in the Comedy Premiere The Chest and in 1998 two TV productions: the one-off My Summer with Des for the BBC and The Vanishing Man for ITV.

Morrissey also starred in a two-part TV comedy drama released on 23 April 2000 ( traditionally William Shakespeare's birthday), Happy Birthday, Shakespeare, in which he portrayed a coach driver. One of his colleagues (played by Amanda Holden) was the object of his desire.

Morrissey also starred in the John Godber film about rugby league Up 'n' Under. Neil would also voice Wilfred Toadflax and Dusty Dogwood in Brambly Hedge, which was produced by HIT Entertainment. Because of this, Neil voiced several characters in the children's television series Bob the Builder, including the lead character, between 1999 and 2011, which was produced by HIT. During his voice acting role, he achieved two UK number 1 singles, with "Can We Fix It?" (which was the 2000 UK Christmas No 1), and "Mambo No 5" in 2001. After the original series ended, he later provided the narration for Morph (in recent years) and Maisy.

In 2002, Morrissey returned to TV screens in the drama series Paradise Heights which ran for two series. He then had a starring role in the BBC sitcom Carrie and Barry from 2004 until 2005.

In 2006, he was the guest host for an episode of Channel 4's The Friday Night Project before taking on the role as presenter on the BBC Two car related game show Petrolheads.

In 2007, he appeared in British TV show Skins as the father of Cassie and made a guest appearance in Neighbours as a priest, remarrying long term characters Susan (Jackie Woodburne) and Karl (Alan Fletcher) on a boat on the River Thames. On 11 October 2007, he made his first appearance in the BBC One school-based drama series, Waterloo Road as the new deputy headteacher, Eddie Lawson. Taking the role to pay for his business problems, Morrissey was in this role for two series stating later that he left due to the poor quality of the scripts, making his final appearance in May 2009.

In August 2009, he promoted a national tour of the play Rain Man. During the 2009 Christmas season he played the role of Buttons in the Pantomime Cinderella at The Assembly Rooms in Derby. By popular demand, Morrissey returned to the stage in the pantomime Aladdin playing the character of Wishey-Washey at The Assembly Rooms in Derby.

In January 2012, Morrissey took on the role of Fagin in Lionel Bart's musical Oliver at the Palace Theatre in Manchester.

In July 2013, Morrissey reprised his Skins role as Marcus Ainsworth, the father of Hannah Murray's character Cassie Ainsworth. He appeared in both parts of Skins Pure.

Morrissey starred alongside Adrian Edmonson, Robert Webb and Miles Jupp in the play Neville's Island at Duke of York's Theatre, London during Autumn 2014.

In 2015, he played a character called Keith, who is Johnny (Joe Maw) and Tee's (Mia McKenna Bruce) villainous mother's former boyfriend, in the CBBC sitcom The Dumping Ground, for one episode. In December 2015, Morrissey starred in BBC Two's comedy-drama A Gert Lush Christmas, playing the father of Russell Howard's character.

In 2016, he joined the cast of Grantchester for the second series. He played the role of Harding Redmond. Also in 2016, he took part in the second series of ITV's reality series Bear Grylls: Mission Survive.

Since 2017, Morrissey has played Greg McConnell in ITV's The Good Karma Hospital.

The actor portrayed Peter Carr in Series 3 of Unforgotten in 2018.

His other West End theatre work includes Speed, Robin Hood, The Daughter In-Law and his critically acclaimed West End performance in A Passionate Woman. In 2005 Morrissey performed in Victoria Wood's musical adaptation of Acorn Antiques alongside Julie Walters, Celia Imrie, Duncan Preston and Josie Lawrence. Morrissey took over the role of Nathan Detroit from Nigel Lindsay in the London revival of Guys and Dolls from March to June 2006.

Spoof show
On 1 April 2006, a BBC Three spoof programme titled Neil Morrissey's Secret documented sides of Morrissey's life that were previously unknown to the world at large. It alleged he has a house, wife and two children in Jordan as well as a degree in Botany for which he had studied for 20 years. These studies were integral to his motivation to find a breakthrough in anti-ageing. According to the documentary he has invented a cream called 'The Essence' which contains extracts of a plant found only in a remote Jordanian village. In the documentary the cream's acolytes include celebrities such as Jane Seymour, Gloria Hunniford and Philippa Forrester. The show followed Morrissey as he carried out his research which involved years of study and crossing continents, funded by his lucrative acting career.

Ultimately Morrissey launches the cream only to have his friends concerned for his health, his laboratory broken into, and a trip to Jordan where he finds that the villagers whose trust he had gained through time spent with them, have abandoned their homes because of the fall-out of his discovery. This hoax was launched on 1 April and despite the suspicions caused by this date as April Fool's Day, it still managed to convince some people that it was true.

Business

Morrissey's love of Welsh poet Dylan Thomas led him to buy up numerous properties in the village of Laugharne, including the Hurst Hotel, the New Three Mariners pub and Brown's Hotel in April 2004 for £670,000. In October 2006, it was announced that the business had put Brown's Hotel on the market to finance the redevelopment of the Hurst Hotel, and the expansion of the private members' club, Hurst House in Covent Garden, London.

In July 2008, with delays encountered on the construction of Hurst House-at-the-Mill, a luxury hotel in Hertfordshire due to open in 2009, the Laugharne-based assets of the Hurst House group went into a packaged administration. The assets were subsequently bought by new investors, resulting in the end of Morrissey's association with Laugharne.

Morrissey part-owned the lease on the Ye Olde Punch Bowl Inn in Marton, North Yorkshire. From this base came the Morrissey Fox range of real ale, developed by Morrissey and chef Richard Fox which is still in production. In June 2009, it was reported that his Welsh pub had failed and the lease to Ye Olde Punch Bowl Inn was handed back to the owner after just 18 months on 22 October 2009.

Morrissey avoided bankruptcy over his failed business ventures but entered an IVA.
Morrissey now owns a chain of pubs in Staffordshire, including The Plume of Feathers in Barlaston, and later The Old Bramshall Inn in Bramshall. The latter opened its doors as a Neil Morrissey pub on 28 June 2018, an event which Morrissey attended. In December 2021 the leasehold was sold and the pub was renamed 'The Butchers Arms'.

Personal life
Morrissey married Amanda Noar in 1987 after meeting her when she guested in an episode of Boon; the couple have a son born in 1989. The couple divorced in 1991. He then became engaged to actress Elizabeth Carling, whom he had first met in 1989, when she too was working on Boon. They parted on good terms, and she later guest-starred alongside him on Men Behaving Badly. His subsequent affairs have been well documented by the British tabloids, including dating Rachel Weisz after starring together in My Summer with Des in 1998. They lived together at his flat in Crouch End, north London.

Morrissey had an affair with Amanda Holden in 2000, leading to her divorce in 2003 from comedian Les Dennis.

Morrissey has numerous tattoos. According to one version of their origin, he applied them himself with needles and Indian ink. On his left arm are his first name and a blob which was going to be his initials before it became infected, causing him to require a tetanus jab. On his right is a squiggle which is a reversed version of The Saint logo. Morrissey himself says the tattoos were done by other boys at the children's home. The boys there apparently saw that he did not have a tattoo and so gave him the option of a tattoo or a beating. He decided on the tattoo and now regrets not taking the other option.

In 2006, Morrissey was awarded an honorary degree from Staffordshire University. He is a supporter of Crystal Palace FC. A fan of real ale, in 2011 he produced a real ale with the club called Palace Ale.

Filmography

Film

Television

References

External links

1962 births
Living people
20th-century English male actors
21st-century English male actors
Alumni of the Guildhall School of Music and Drama
English brewers
English businesspeople
English male film actors
English male television actors
English male voice actors
English people of Irish descent
Actors from Staffordshire
People from Penkhull
People from Stafford